Oligobuninae is an extinct subfamily of the family Mustelidae known from Miocene deposits in North America.

The subfamily was described by J. A. Baskin in 1998; of the genera that he assigned to this clade, seven are recognized today - Brachypsalis, Megalictis, Oligobunis, Promartes, Zodiolestes, Floridictis and Parabrachypsalis - representing thirteen separate species. Potamotherium, usually considered to belong to Oligobuninae, has been reclassified as a basal pinnipedomorph in the family Semantoridae, which also includes Puijila and Semantor.

References 

Prehistoric mustelids
Miocene carnivorans